Hugh  is the English-language variant of the masculine given name Hugues, itself the Old French variant of Hugo, a short form of Continental Germanic given names beginning in the element hug- "mind, spirit" (Old English hyġe). 

The Germanic name is on record beginning in the 8th century, in variants Chugo, Hugo, Huc, Ucho, Ugu, Uogo, Ogo, Ougo, etc. The name's popularity in the Middle Ages ultimately derives from its use by Frankish nobility,  beginning with Duke of the Franks and Count of Paris Hugh the Great (898–956) .
The Old French form was adopted into English from the Norman period (e.g. Hugh of Montgomery, 2nd Earl of Shrewsbury d. 1098; Hugh d'Avranches, 1st Earl of Chester, d. 1101).

The spelling Hugh in English is from the Picard variant spelling Hughes, where the orthography -gh- takes the role of -gu- in standard French, i.e. to express the phoneme /g/ as opposed to the affricate /ʒ/ taken by the grapheme g before front vowels (as in Italian). 
The modern English pronunciation /hjuː/ is influenced by the Norman variant form Hue (/hyː/, /yː/), now only a surname, mainly from Normandy. 
 
The Old High German name Hugo was adopted as third declension nominative into Middle Latin (Hugo, Hugonis); 
in English, however, historical figures of the continental Middle Ages are conventionally given the name in its modern English spelling, as in 
Hugh Capet (941–996), Hugh Magnus of France (1007–1025), Hugh of Cluny (1024–1109), Hugh of Châteauneuf (1053–1132), etc.

Modern variants of the name include German Hugo and Uwe, Dutch Huig, Frisian Hauke, Welsh Huw, Italian Ugo.

In the tradition of anglicisation of Gaelic names by using similar-sounding, but etymologically unrelated replacements, Hugh also serves as a replacement for  Aodh and Ùisdean (see Hughes (surname), Hughes (given name)).

People
 Hugh D. Auchincloss (1897-1976), American stockbroker and lawyer, stepfather of Gore Vidal and Jacqueline Kennedy Onassis
 Hugh Beaumont (born 1909), American Actor
 Hugh M. Bland (1898–1967), Justice of the Arkansas Supreme Court 
 Hugh Bonneville (born 1963), English actor
 Hugh Cornwell (born 1949), English musician, guitarist 
 Hugh Dancy (born 1975), English actor
 Hugh Dane (1942–2018), American actor
 Hugh Edmund Peter de Mel (1907-1992), Sri Lankan Sinhala politician
 Hugh Downs (1921–2020), American broadcaster and announcer
 Hugh Fearnley-Whittingstall (born 1965), English chef, broadcaster and campaigner
 Warnakulasuriya Ichchampullige Hugh Fernando (1916-1993), Sri Lankan Sinhala politician
 Hugh Norman Gregory Fernando (1910-1976), Chief Justice of Sri Lanka from 1966-1973
 Hughie Gallacher (1903-1957), Scottish footballer
 Hugh Glass (1783-1833), American frontiersman
 Hugh Grant (born 1960), English actor
 Hugh Griffith (1912-1980), Welsh actor
 Hugh Hefner (1926–2017), American adult magazine publisher
 Hugh Herbert (1885–1952), American motion picture comedian
 Hugh Hopper (1945–2009), English musician, bassist
 Hugh Jackman (born 1968), Australian actor   
 Hugh Lane (1875–1915), Irish aviators
 Hugh Laurie (born 1959), English actor
 Hugh McDowell (1953–2018), English cellist, member of Electric Light Orchestra
 Hugh McElhenny (born 1928), American football (gridiron) player
 Hugh O'Brian (1925–2016), American actor
 Hugh Paddick (1915–2000), English actor
 Hugh G. Parker, Jr. (1934–2007), American architect
 Hugh Robertson (basketball) (born 1989), American basketball player
 Hugh Thornton (American football) (born 1991), American football player
 Hugh Shelley Meehan (born 1999)
 Hugh Walpole (1884–1941), English novelist
 Hugh E. Wright (1879–1940), French-English actor

See also
Hugh (disambiguation)
Page titles beginning with "Hugh" 
Huginn
Hyglac

References

English masculine given names
Masculine given names

ro:Hugo
ru:Гуго